, nicknamed "Gucci", is a Japanese served professional baseball second baseman and former manager of the Chiba Lotte Marines of Nippon Professional Baseball (NPB).

As a member of the Chicago White Sox in 2005, Iguchi became the first Japanese-born position player to win the World Series.

Career

Early life and amateur career

Iguchi began playing in high school and after graduating in 1993, went to Aoyama Gakuin University where he distinguished himself by hitting the Tohto University Baseball League record of eight home runs in a season and winning the triple crown. He was a member of Japanese National Team in 1996 Summer Olympics that won the silver medal.

Fukuoka Daiei Hawks
He was the first pick in the 1996 draft by Fukuoka Daiei Hawks.

In his debut year of 1997, he hit a grand slam in the first game of his professional career. He suffered a shoulder injury in the 2000 season and had a surgery which ended his season. He recovered fully in 2001 hitting 30 home runs and leading the league with a personal best 44 stolen bases. In 2003, he hit over .300, had over 100 RBI and led the league in steals.

Chicago White Sox

He left Fukuoka Daiei after the 2004 season to play for the Chicago White Sox. During the  MLB season, he had a .278 batting average with 15 home runs and 15 stolen bases. In the 2005 AL Division Series, he hit a go-ahead 3-run home run in Game 2 against the Boston Red Sox, helping the White Sox to a win on their way to a three-game ALDS sweep over Boston, and ultimately a World Series championship three weeks later.

In 2006, Iguchi had two multi-homer games, both times hitting a grand slam (during the May 20 game involving a bench-clearing brawl) and another home run.

Earlier that same year, on April 15, he made arguably the best defensive play of his career against the Toronto Blue Jays, falling after charging, and while fielding, a slow infield chopper hit by Bengie Molina. Despite this, Iguchi would throw Molina out by plenty from his horizontal position.

Philadelphia Phillies
On July 27, 2007, he was traded to the Philadelphia Phillies for pitcher Michael Dubee. He was the first Asian-born player to join the Phillies.

San Diego Padres

On December 18, 2007, Iguchi signed a one-year deal with the San Diego Padres.  He was released on September 1, 2008.

Second Phillies stint
On September 5, 2008, Philadelphia signed Iguchi, making it the second time the team had acquired him, in less than 14 months. Because Iguchi joined the Phillies after September 1, he was ineligible for the team's postseason roster; thus, Iguchi was not with the Phillies when they defeated the Tampa Bay Rays in the World Series (although he did receive a World Series ring).

Chiba Lotte Marines
On January 19, 2009, he returned to Japan to play for the Chiba Lotte Marines.

Iguchi announced his retirement from baseball after the close of the 2017 season in Japan.

References

External links

1974 births
Living people
Aoyama Gakuin University alumni
Baseball players at the 1996 Summer Olympics
Chiba Lotte Marines managers
Chiba Lotte Marines players
Chicago White Sox players
Fukuoka Daiei Hawks players
Japanese expatriate baseball players in the United States
Lake Elsinore Storm players
Major League Baseball players from Japan
Major League Baseball second basemen
Medalists at the 1996 Summer Olympics
Nippon Professional Baseball first basemen
Nippon Professional Baseball second basemen
Nippon Professional Baseball shortstops
Olympic baseball players of Japan
Olympic medalists in baseball
Olympic silver medalists for Japan
Baseball people from Tokyo Metropolis
People from Nishitōkyō, Tokyo
Philadelphia Phillies players
San Diego Padres players